Peter Cross is a former professional rugby league footballer who played in the 1970s and 80s. He is the brother of former Manly player, Greg Cross.

References

1958 births
Living people
Australian rugby league players
North Sydney Bears players
Rugby league second-rows